Brent Allen Gaff (born October 5, 1958) is a former American professional baseball player who played for the New York Mets from 1982–84.

Gaff was born in Fort Wayne, Indiana and attended Churubusco High School in Churubusco, Indiana.  He was drafted by the New York Mets in 6th the round (146th overall) of the 1977 Major League Baseball Draft.  He was 23 years old when he broke into the big leagues on July 7, 1982, with the New York Mets. Although the Mets lost the game, 3-2, to the San Francisco Giants, Mets manager George Bamberger was quoted as saying, "The kid's got good command of his stuff and great confidence in himself. His attitude's outstanding. He says 'Give me the ball and let me go.' I wanted him to win that game bad." 

Gaff missed the entire 1985 season due to a partial tear of the rotator cuff in his right shoulder, and was released by the Mets in November of that year.

References

External links
, or Baseball Almanac, or Retrosheet, or Pura Pelota (Venezuelan Winter League)

1958 births
Living people
Baseball players from Fort Wayne, Indiana
Jackson Mets players
Major League Baseball pitchers
New York Mets players
Tiburones de La Guaira players
American expatriate baseball players in Venezuela
Tidewater Tides players
Wausau Mets players
Wausau Timbers players